Robert George Thornton (born July 10, 1962) is an American basketball coach and former player who played nine seasons in the NBA. He last served as the lead assistant coach for the Perth Wildcats in the Australian NBL.

Thornton played college basketball at University of California, Irvine and Saddleback Community College, and was selected by the New York Knicks with the 87th pick of the 1984 NBA draft.

Thornton played for five NBA teams (New York Knicks, Philadelphia 76ers, Minnesota Timberwolves, Utah Jazz and Washington Wizards) and averaged 3.0 points and 2.5 rebounds in 283 total games. He also played three seasons in the Italian A-1 league with Rome, Siena and Pavia.

He later held coaching positions with the CBA's Yakima Sun Kings and Quad City Thunder, the NBDL's Huntsville Flight, and the Chicago Bulls and Minnesota Timberwolves. From 2007 to 2011, he worked as an advance scout for the Oklahoma City Thunder. He was hired as an assistant coach by the Memphis Grizzlies on December 5, 2011.

In January 2021, Thornton moved to Australia to become lead assistant coach of the Perth Wildcats.

Reference

External links
College & NBA stats @ basketballreference.com
NBA.com coach profile

1962 births
Living people
American expatriate basketball people in Italy
American expatriate basketball people in Spain
American men's basketball coaches
American men's basketball players
Arkansas RimRockers players
Basketball coaches from California
Basketball players from Los Angeles
Cal State Fullerton Titans men's basketball coaches
Chapman Panthers men's basketball coaches
Chicago Bulls assistant coaches
Chicago Rockers players
Continental Basketball Association coaches
Huntsville Flight coaches
Memphis Grizzlies assistant coaches
Mens Sana Basket players
Minnesota Timberwolves assistant coaches
Minnesota Timberwolves players
New York Knicks draft picks
New York Knicks players
Oklahoma City Thunder assistant coaches
Pallacanestro Virtus Roma players
Philadelphia 76ers players
Power forwards (basketball)
Quad City Thunder players
Saddleback Gauchos men's basketball players
Sioux Falls Skyforce (CBA) players
Sportspeople from Mission Viejo, California
UC Irvine Anteaters men's basketball players
Utah Jazz players
Washington Bullets players